Henry Augustus Stephen Pierre (15 July 1941 – 5 April 2021) was one of the earliest Venezuelan proponents of rock and roll music.

Biography
Henry Stephen was born in Cabimas, Zulia state, Venezuela. He once belonged to the "Los Impala" music group, and later became a solo artist with the 1969 hit song "Limón, Limonero". In 1974, RCA Records awarded him a Gold record for selling one million copies of the song.

Later in his career, he became an actor in Venezuelan telenovelas.

Stephen died from COVID-19 in Caracas on 5 April 2021, during the COVID-19 pandemic in Venezuela.

See also 
Venezuelan music

References

1941 births
2021 deaths
People from Cabimas
People from Maracaibo
Venezuelan male telenovela actors
Deaths from the COVID-19 pandemic in Venezuela
20th-century Venezuelan  male singers
Death in Caracas